Assani Bajope (born April 14, 1982) is an Ugandan footballer.

Trivia
Operating as a defensive midfielder, Bajope played for Kampala City Council FC before a transfer to Ethiopian Premier League club Saint-George SA in July 2006.

International
He was also a member of Uganda national football team with more than 20 caps, playing from 2003–2008.

International goals
Scores and results list Uganda's goal tally first.

References

External links 
 

1982 births
Living people
Ugandan footballers
Uganda international footballers
Ugandan expatriate footballers
Expatriate footballers in Ethiopia
Kampala Capital City Authority FC players
Saint George S.C. players
Association football midfielders
Ugandan expatriate sportspeople in Ethiopia